The Kalisz Voivodeship was a voivodeship (province) of the Polish People's Republic from 1975 to 1989, and the Republic of Poland from 1989 to 1998. Its capital was Kalisz, and it was centred on the Kalisz Region. It was established on 1 June 1975, from the parts of the Poznań, Wrocław, and Łódź Voivodeships, and existed until 31 December 1998, when it was partitioned between then-established Greater Poland, Lower Silesian, and Łódź Voivodeships.Ustawa z dnia 24 lipca 1998 r. o wprowadzeniu zasadniczego trójstopniowego podziału terytorialnego państwa (Dz.U. z 1998 r. nr 96, poz. 603).

Citations

Notes

References 

Kalisz
History of Greater Poland
Former voivodeships of Poland (1975–1998)
States and territories established in 1975
States and territories disestablished in 1998
1975 establishments in Poland
1998 disestablishments in Poland